The Serpukhov constituency (No.126) is a Russian legislative constituency in Moscow Oblast. The constituency covers southern Moscow Oblast. It was created in 1995 from parts of Podolsk, Kolomna and Odintsovo constituencies.

Members elected

Election results

1995

|-
! colspan=2 style="background-color:#E9E9E9;text-align:left;vertical-align:top;" |Candidate
! style="background-color:#E9E9E9;text-align:left;vertical-align:top;" |Party
! style="background-color:#E9E9E9;text-align:right;" |Votes
! style="background-color:#E9E9E9;text-align:right;" |%
|-
|style="background-color:"|
|align=left|Georgy Tikhonov
|align=left|Power to the People
|
|19.47%
|-
|style="background-color:"|
|align=left|Vladimir Lukin
|align=left|Yabloko
|
|14.33%
|-
|style="background-color:"|
|align=left|Valentina Kabanova
|align=left|Independent
|
|12.33%
|-
|style="background-color:"|
|align=left|Anatoly Sidorenko
|align=left|Independent
|
|7.79%
|-
|style="background-color:#3A46CE"|
|align=left|Irina Chernova
|align=left|Democratic Choice of Russia – United Democrats
|
|5.70%
|-
|style="background-color:"|
|align=left|Aleksandr Popov
|align=left|Independent
|
|4.36%
|-
|style="background-color:"|
|align=left|Ivan Silayev
|align=left|Independent
|
|4.04%
|-
|style="background-color:"|
|align=left|Aleksandr Bessmertnykh
|align=left|Independent
|
|3.81%
|-
|style="background-color:#1C1A0D"|
|align=left|Ivan Panchishin
|align=left|Forward, Russia!
|
|2.80%
|-
|style="background-color:"|
|align=left|Yevgeny Sokolov
|align=left|Liberal Democratic Party
|
|2.25%
|-
|style="background-color:"|
|align=left|Sergey Volodin
|align=left|Independent
|
|2.02%
|-
|style="background-color:#DA2021"|
|align=left|Viktor Ustinov
|align=left|Ivan Rybkin Bloc
|
|1.93%
|-
|style="background-color:"|
|align=left|Pyotr Stolyar
|align=left|Independent
|
|1.67%
|-
|style="background-color:#295EC4"|
|align=left|Leonid Shpigel
|align=left|Party of Economic Freedom
|
|0.95%
|-
|style="background-color:#3C3E42"|
|align=left|Vladimir Burenin
|align=left|Duma-96
|
|0.47%
|-
|style="background-color:"|
|align=left|Aleksandr Krasnoperov
|align=left|Independent
|
|0.31%
|-
|style="background-color:#000000"|
|colspan=2 |against all
|
|12.87%
|-
| colspan="5" style="background-color:#E9E9E9;"|
|- style="font-weight:bold"
| colspan="3" style="text-align:left;" | Total
| 
| 100%
|-
| colspan="5" style="background-color:#E9E9E9;"|
|- style="font-weight:bold"
| colspan="4" |Source:
|
|}

1999

|-
! colspan=2 style="background-color:#E9E9E9;text-align:left;vertical-align:top;" |Candidate
! style="background-color:#E9E9E9;text-align:left;vertical-align:top;" |Party
! style="background-color:#E9E9E9;text-align:right;" |Votes
! style="background-color:#E9E9E9;text-align:right;" |%
|-
|style="background-color:"|
|align=left|Georgy Tikhonov (incumbent)
|align=left|Independent
|
|18.81%
|-
|style="background-color:"|
|align=left|Marina Ignatova
|align=left|Independent
|
|15.72%
|-
|style="background-color:"|
|align=left|Yury Tebin
|align=left|Independent
|
|13.27%
|-
|style="background-color:"|
|align=left|Vera Mikheyeva
|align=left|Independent
|
|7.96%
|-
|style="background-color:"|
|align=left|Vitaly Pomazov
|align=left|Yabloko
|
|5.33%
|-
|style="background-color:"|
|align=left|Yury Gekht
|align=left|Independent
|
|5.21%
|-
|style="background-color:#084284"|
|align=left|Vladimir Golovnyov
|align=left|Spiritual Heritage
|
|5.13%
|-
|style="background-color:#020266"|
|align=left|Vladimir Alekseyev
|align=left|Russian Socialist Party
|
|4.47%
|-
|style="background-color:#8A8A8A"|
|align=left|Aleksandr Kravchuk
|align=left|Russian Patriotic Popular Movement
|
|2.77%
|-
|style="background-color:"|
|align=left|Aleksandr Popov
|align=left|Independent
|
|2.54%
|-
|style="background-color:"|
|align=left|Nadia Yenikeyeva
|align=left|Liberal Democratic Party
|
|1.16%
|-
|style="background-color:"|
|align=left|Nikolay Yeremin
|align=left|Our Home – Russia
|
|1.03%
|-
|style="background-color:#000000"|
|colspan=2 |against all
|
|14.11%
|-
| colspan="5" style="background-color:#E9E9E9;"|
|- style="font-weight:bold"
| colspan="3" style="text-align:left;" | Total
| 
| 100%
|-
| colspan="5" style="background-color:#E9E9E9;"|
|- style="font-weight:bold"
| colspan="4" |Source:
|
|}

2003

|-
! colspan=2 style="background-color:#E9E9E9;text-align:left;vertical-align:top;" |Candidate
! style="background-color:#E9E9E9;text-align:left;vertical-align:top;" |Party
! style="background-color:#E9E9E9;text-align:right;" |Votes
! style="background-color:#E9E9E9;text-align:right;" |%
|-
|style="background-color:"|
|align=left|Vladimir Smolensky
|align=left|Independent
|
|21.91%
|-
|style="background-color:"|
|align=left|Yulia Alekseyeva
|align=left|Independent
|
|15.81%
|-
|style="background-color:"|
|align=left|Georgy Tikhonov (incumbent)
|align=left|Communist Party
|
|15.62%
|-
|style="background-color:"|
|align=left|Artyom Lavrishchev
|align=left|United Russia
|
|14.32%
|-
|style="background-color:"|
|align=left|Vladislav Volkov
|align=left|Liberal Democratic Party
|
|4.07%
|-
|style="background-color:"|
|align=left|Olga Kudeshkina
|align=left|Independent
|
|2.79%
|-
|style="background-color:#1042A5"|
|align=left|Stepan Shevchenko
|align=left|Union of Right Forces
|
|2.62%
|-
|style="background-color:"|
|align=left|Mikhail Chelnokov
|align=left|Agrarian Party
|
|1.62%
|-
|style="background-color:#00A1FF"|
|align=left|Leonid Baron
|align=left|Party of Russia's Rebirth-Russian Party of Life
|
|1.48%
|-
|style="background-color:#000000"|
|colspan=2 |against all
|
|17.51%
|-
| colspan="5" style="background-color:#E9E9E9;"|
|- style="font-weight:bold"
| colspan="3" style="text-align:left;" | Total
| 
| 100%
|-
| colspan="5" style="background-color:#E9E9E9;"|
|- style="font-weight:bold"
| colspan="4" |Source:
|
|}

2016

|-
! colspan=2 style="background-color:#E9E9E9;text-align:left;vertical-align:top;" |Candidate
! style="background-color:#E9E9E9;text-align:left;vertical-align:top;" |Party
! style="background-color:#E9E9E9;text-align:right;" |Votes
! style="background-color:#E9E9E9;text-align:right;" |%
|-
|style="background-color: " |
|align=left|Yury Oleynikov
|align=left|United Russia
|
|39.51%
|-
|style="background-color:"|
|align=left|Boris Ivanyuzhenkov
|align=left|Communist Party
|
|11.87%
|-
|style="background-color:"|
|align=left|Pavel Zalesov
|align=left|A Just Russia
|
|11.63%
|-
|style="background-color:"|
|align=left|Anna Redchenko
|align=left|Liberal Democratic Party
|
|8.53%
|-
|style="background-color:"|
|align=left|Nikolay Kuznetsov
|align=left|Yabloko
|
|5.50%
|-
|style="background:"| 
|align=left|Tatyana Rybina
|align=left|Communists of Russia
|
|4.78%
|-
|style="background-color:"|
|align=left|Pavel Khlyupin
|align=left|Rodina
|
|3.65%
|-
|style="background-color:"|
|align=left|Irina Vologdina
|align=left|The Greens
|
|3.17%
|-
|style="background:"| 
|align=left|Lyudmila Chumakova
|align=left|Party of Growth
|
|2.69%
|-
|style="background:"| 
|align=left|Lev Shchukin
|align=left|People's Freedom Party
|
|1.72%
|-
|style="background:"| 
|align=left|Larisa Svintsova
|align=left|Patriots of Russia
|
|1.37%
|-
| colspan="5" style="background-color:#E9E9E9;"|
|- style="font-weight:bold"
| colspan="3" style="text-align:left;" | Total
| 
| 100%
|-
| colspan="5" style="background-color:#E9E9E9;"|
|- style="font-weight:bold"
| colspan="4" |Source:
|
|}

2021

|-
! colspan=2 style="background-color:#E9E9E9;text-align:left;vertical-align:top;" |Candidate
! style="background-color:#E9E9E9;text-align:left;vertical-align:top;" |Party
! style="background-color:#E9E9E9;text-align:right;" |Votes
! style="background-color:#E9E9E9;text-align:right;" |%
|-
|style="background-color:"|
|align=left|Aleksandr Kogan
|align=left|United Russia
|
|38.76%
|-
|style="background-color:"|
|align=left|Andrey Cherepennikov
|align=left|Communist Party
|
|19.01%
|-
|style="background-color:"|
|align=left|Dmitry Kalinin
|align=left|Liberal Democratic Party
|
|6.86%
|-
|style="background:"| 
|align=left|Igor Luzin
|align=left|Communists of Russia
|
|5.35%
|-
|style="background-color: " |
|align=left|Aleksandr Pashkov
|align=left|New People
|
|4.60%
|-
|style="background:"| 
|align=left|Nikolay Kuznetsov
|align=left|Party of Growth
|
|4.59%
|-
|style="background-color:"|
|align=left|Lilia Belova
|align=left|The Greens
|
|4.17%
|-
|style="background-color: "|
|align=left|Nikita Tamarkin
|align=left|Party of Pensioners
|
|3.84%
|-
|style="background-color:"|
|align=left|Pavel Khlyupin
|align=left|Rodina
|
|3.05%
|-
|style="background-color:"|
|align=left|Sergey Barsegyan
|align=left|Russian Party of Freedom and Justice
|
|2.20%
|-
| colspan="5" style="background-color:#E9E9E9;"|
|- style="font-weight:bold"
| colspan="3" style="text-align:left;" | Total
| 
| 100%
|-
| colspan="5" style="background-color:#E9E9E9;"|
|- style="font-weight:bold"
| colspan="4" |Source:
|
|}

Notes

References

Russian legislative constituencies
Politics of Moscow Oblast